Slingerz FC is a Guyanese football club based in Vergenoegen. The club competes in the West Demerara Senior League, one of several regional leagues in Guyana. Founded in 2013, the club never qualified for the GFF National Super League, the top football league in Guyana at the time. However, the team has been very successful in Guyana's many cup competitions, including winning the Mayors Cup, Guyana's top cup competition, in 2015 after finishing runners-up in the previous tournament in 2013. The team has also finished champions or runners-up in several smaller cup competitions.

The club was an inaugural member of Guyana's new first division, the GFF Elite League, in 2015.

Honors

League titles 

 Guyana National Football League
 Winners (1): 2015–16
 West Demerara Senior League
 Winners (1): 2013

Cups 
 Guyana Mayors Cup
 Winners (1): 2015
 Runners-up (1): 2013
 GFA Banks Beer Knockout Tournament
 Winners (1): 2013–14
 Go For Gold Extravaganza
 Runners-up (1): 2013

See also 
Football in Guyana
GFF National Super League

References 

Football clubs in Guyana